Una National Park was established on 29 May 2008 around the rivers Upper Una River, Krka and the Unac. It is Bosnia and Herzegovina's largest national park. The main purpose of the park is to protect the unspoiled Una river and its tributaries Krka and Unac, which run through it.

Geography

On the eastern side border of the park goes from the entrance of the Unac River into its canyon, few kilometers downstream from town of Drvar, and follows the Unac and its canyon all the way to the confluence with the Una in town of Martin Brod. From there park border follows the Una on the right and state border between Bosnia and Herzegovina and Croatia on the left, until it reach a small town of Ripač, few kilometers upstream from town of Bihać.
National park Una areal distribution is within following geographic coordinates:

 northernmost point:  (inhabited settlement Podastrana)
 southernmost point:  (hill Gradina )
 westernmost point:  (hill )
 easternmost point:  (locality Vrtočke Bare )

Waters

The Una's waterfalls and white water rapids highlight the park. The most famous waterfalls are those at Martin Brod, where the popular "International Una Regatta" kayaking competition begins, and Štrbački Buk further downstream.
Throughout the park, visitors can enjoy prime conditions for rafting, fishing, cycling, hiking, and camping. Jumping from the city bridges in Bihać and Bosanska Krupa is also popular. Largest waterfall on the Una river is Štrbački Buk, and is one of the main feature in the Park.

Biology
Una National Park is also noted for its biodiversity, with 30 fish species, 130 bird species, and other animals, including lynx, fox, wolf, bear and chamois.

History

Area of the park has rich cultural-historic heritage and numerous archaeological sites, many dating from the prehistoric period. 
Significant historical and cultural heritage of the area within and outside the park zone are the Roman fort Milančeva Kula, Rmanj Monastery, medieval fortress Ostrovica above Kulen Vakuf, as well as outside the park zone Sokolačka Kula fortress in Sokolac village near Bihać and Ostrožac Castle between Bihać and Bosanska Krupa.

Peace Park Plitvice-Una
Una National Park is close to Plješivica mountain virgin forest, which stretches between Bosnia and Herzegovina and Croatia, and Croatia's Plitvice Lakes National Park.

Veliki Slap is the tallest waterfall in Croatia.

See also

List of protected areas of Bosnia and Herzegovina

Sources

References

External links
 National Park Una

National parks of Bosnia and Herzegovina